Wayo is a locality mainly in the Upper Lachlan Shire, New South Wales, Australia. Part of it is in Goulburn Mulwaree Council. It lies about 20 km northwest of Goulburn and 110 km northeast of Canberra.

References

Upper Lachlan Shire
Goulburn Mulwaree Council
Localities in New South Wales
Southern Tablelands